Hadisubeno Sosrowerdojo (February 11, 1912 – April 24, 1971) was the last chairman of the Partai Nasional Indonesia (Indonesian: Indonesian National Party) before its dissolution in the New Order. He also served as the Mayor of Semarang from 1951 until 1958, and the Governor of Central Java from 1958 until 1960. He was famous for publicly comparing Sukarno and Suharto and for challenging Suharto's rule during his early years.

Early life 
Hadisubeno was born on 11 February 1912, at a small city in Pacitan, Nglorok. He was the second of the three sons of Raden Mas Sosrowerdojo, who at the time of his birth served as wedana in Pacitan. His older brother was Sumadijo, while his younger brother was Sempu Mulyono and Sri Mulyo. Sumadijo died during his youth at Belgium, due to a failed operation.

His older brother, Sumadijo, served as the police chief in Cirebon. Once a time, Sumadijo clashed with the resident of Cirebon at that time, van der Plas. Upon the incident, he asked for his resignation and continued to study in Belgium. He refused to study in the Netherlands due to lasting sentiment. Hadisubeno's younger brother, Mulyono, served as the head of the criminal regiment in the Jakarta police, while his youngest brother, Sri Mulyo, died during his youth.

Family 
Hadisubeno was married to Raden Ayu Koeniah, a royal descendant from Solo, on 1939. The marriage resulted in 4 children: Sri Hartati Wulandari, born in Solo on 12 June 1940, Sri Kresno Dewantoro, born in Pekalongan on 1 June 1944, Sri Harni Kusumo Djahnawi, born in Solo on 19 December 1947, and Sajid Sudirotomo, born in Semarang on 4 November 1951.

His first daughter, Sri Hartati Wulandari, was a famous Javanese dancer. She married Suryadi, the chairman of the Indonesian Democratic Party, in 1969.

References

Bibliography 

 
 

Indonesian National Party politicians
1912 births
1971 deaths
People from Pacitan Regency
Governors of Central Java